Adam Joseph van Koeverden  (born January 29, 1982) is a Canadian sprint kayaker and politician. He is an Olympic gold medallist in the K-1 500m category (2004) and a two-time world champion in K-1 500 (2007) and K-1 1000 (2011), winning four Olympic and eight world championship medals. His home club is the Burloak Canoe Club in Oakville, Ontario.

In the 2019 Canadian federal election, Van Koeverden was first elected to the Canadian House of Commons, representing the electoral district of Milton as a member of the Liberal Party of Canada caucus.

Early life and education
He was born in Toronto to a Dutch father, Joe van Koeverden, and a Hungarian mother, Beata Bokrossy. Van Koeverden attended St. John Catholic Elementary School in Oakville, Ontario, graduating in 1996. He then proceeded to go to St. Ignatius of Loyola Catholic Secondary School also located in Oakville. He plays guitar.

Van Koeverden is a graduate of McMaster University's Bachelor of Science Kinesiology program in Hamilton, Ontario.  He graduated in June 2007 as valedictorian of his class.

Career

Canoe sprinting 
He won a bronze medal in the K-1 1000 m at the 1999 world junior championships in Zagreb, Croatia, and then became world junior marathon champion in 2000. His first success as a senior came with a silver medal at the 2003 world championships in Gainesville, Georgia, in the men's K-1 1000 m event. At the 2004 Summer Olympics Van Koeverden won two medals, including a gold in the K-1 500 m and a bronze in the K-1 1000 m. He was Canada's flag bearer at the closing ceremonies and was later awarded the Lou Marsh Trophy as Canada's top athlete of 2004.

In 2005, Van Koeverden won two medals at the 2005 ICF Canoe Sprint World Championships in Zagreb: a silver in the K-1 1000 m and a bronze in the K-1 500 m. At the 2006 ICF Canoe Sprint World Championships in Szeged, Hungary, Van Koeverden finished fourth in both the K-1 500 m and 1000 m finals. At the 2006 Canadian Sprint Canoe Championships in Regina, Saskatchewan, he won five gold medals (K-1 1000 m, K-2 1000 m, K-4 1000 m, K-4 200 m, and War Canoe), and two silver medals (K-1 200 m and K-2 200 m).

Van Koeverden had great success on the World Cup circuit in 2007, going undefeated over both 500 m and 1000 m in three competitions.  At the 2007 ICF Canoe Sprint World Championships in Duisburg, Van Koeverden won the gold medal in the K-1 500 m and the silver medal in the K-1 1000 m.

Van Koeverden beat his own world record in the K-1 500 m at the 2008 Beijing Olympics with a time of 1:35.554. He finished eighth place in the 1000m race, and finished with a silver medal in the K-1 500 m race. Originally, he had been listed as bronze medalist, until the scoreboard was corrected to indicate he had finished second. Van Koeverden had led most of the way from the start, but was overtaken by the Australian winner Ken Wallace at the finish line, with British bronze medallist Tim Brabants ending in a photo finish with him.

In the leadup to the 2008 Beijing Olympics, Van Koeverden was named flag bearer for the Canadian Olympic team at the opening ceremony, making him one of the few athletes to carry Canada's flag twice at the Olympics. To celebrate the success of the hometown hero, on October 17, 2008, Oakville Mayor Rob Burton and local councillors hosted a meet and greet session. A ceremonial street name unveiling to honor Van Koeverden preceded the event. Adam van Koeverden Street, which is currently known as Water Street, is located near his Oakville harbour home club, the Burloak Canoe Club.

At the 2009 world championships in Dartmouth, he won a bronze medal in the K-1 1000 m event. The following year, he won another bronze, only this time it was in the K-1 500 m event. Continuing to build on these achievements at the world's, Van Koeverden went to the 2011 world championships competing in the K-1 1000 m, where he finally won gold.

At the 2012 London Olympics he won the silver medal in the same event, while Norwegian Eirik Verås Larsen won gold. At the 2016 Rio Olympics he finished first in the B final, placing ninth overall.

Politics 
On October 4, 2018, Van Koeverden announced he would be seeking the nomination of the Liberal Party of Canada in the riding of Milton to be a candidate in the 2019 Canadian federal election. Van Koeverden won the Liberal nomination on January 20, 2019, and won the Liberal seat in Milton on October 21, 2019, defeating the incumbent, Conservative Party deputy leader Lisa Raitt, taking over 51% of the vote to Raitt's 36%.

In the 2021 federal election, Van Koeverden received over 51% of the vote defeating challenger Nadeem Akbar who carried just over 33% of the vote.

In 2022, following the Russian invasion of Ukraine, Van Koeverden was one of the 313 Canadians banned from entering Russia because of his support for Ukraine.

Also in 2022, Van Koeverden told an Ontario born New Zealand school teacher to "F--- off" during a heated exchange on Canada's covid vaccine policy.  Van Koeverden apologized indirectly for the sleight of tongue.

Electoral record

See also

List of Canadian sports personalities

References

External links

Adam van Koeverden on Real Champions
Canoe09.ca profile
CanoeKayak Canada profile

Official website of Adam van Koeverden

21st-century Canadian politicians
1982 births
Canadian male canoeists
Canadian people of Dutch descent
Canadian people of Hungarian descent
Canadian sportsperson-politicians
Canoeists from Toronto
Canoeists at the 2004 Summer Olympics
Canoeists at the 2008 Summer Olympics
Canoeists at the 2012 Summer Olympics
Canoeists at the 2015 Pan American Games
Canoeists at the 2016 Summer Olympics
ICF Canoe Sprint World Championships medalists in kayak
Liberal Party of Canada MPs
Living people
Lou Marsh Trophy winners
McMaster University alumni
Medalists at the 2004 Summer Olympics
Medalists at the 2008 Summer Olympics
Medalists at the 2012 Summer Olympics
Members of the House of Commons of Canada from Ontario
Olympic bronze medalists for Canada
Olympic canoeists of Canada
Olympic gold medalists for Canada
Olympic medalists in canoeing
Olympic silver medalists for Canada
Pan American Games bronze medalists for Canada
Pan American Games medalists in canoeing
Sportspeople from Milton, Ontario
Sportspeople from Oakville, Ontario
Medalists at the 2015 Pan American Games